Rare, Vol. 1 is the first of two B-side compilation albums by Ultravox. This release chronicles the B-sides of the singles from 1980 to 1983, spanning the Vienna, Rage in Eden and Quartet albums. Rare includes all B-side tracks throughout this period, with the exception of "I Never Wanted To Begin (12" Version)" which can be found at the end of the remastered Rage In Eden CD.

Despite its name, it has been relatively easy to acquire the songs on this release over the years. Many of the tracks on Rare, Vol. 1 have been re-released on remastered CD versions of their respective albums, but the album nonetheless still remains an exclusive source for several songs, most notably the various live tracks on this release.

Track listing
"Waiting" - 3.54
"Face to Face" (Live) - 6.04
"King's Lead Hat" (Live) - 4.06
"Passionate Reply" - 4.18
"Herr X" - 5.50
"Alles Klar" - 4.54
"Keep Talking" - 6.23
"I Never Wanted to Begin" - 3.32
"Paths and Angles" - 4.21
"Private Lives" (Live) - 4.52
"All Stood Still" (Live) - 4.21
"Hosanna (In Excelsis Deo)" - 4.22
"Monument" - 3.16
"The Thin Wall" (Live) - 5.56
"Break Your Back" - 3.28
"Reap the Wild Wind" (Live) - 3.57
"Overlook" - 4.04

B-side compilation albums
1993 compilation albums
Ultravox compilation albums
Chrysalis Records compilation albums